Moses Ian Kirkconnell is a Caymanian politician and former Deputy Premier of the Cayman Islands. He is the member of the Parliament of the Cayman Islands for Cayman Brac West and Little Cayman currently serving his fifth term. Kirkconnell is a member of the People's Progressive Movement party.

Political career 
He was re-elected at the 2021 Caymanian general election.

References

External links 
 Legislative Assembly Biography

Living people
Government ministers of the Cayman Islands
People's Progressive Movement (Cayman Islands) politicians
Members of the Parliament of the Cayman Islands
People from Grand Cayman
21st-century British politicians
Year of birth missing (living people)